Abercorn is a village in the Brome-Missisquoi Regional County Municipality in the Estrie region of Québec, Canada. The population as of the Canada 2016 Census was 334.

It is bordered by the larger township of Sutton to the north and east, by Frelighsburg to the west, and the town of Richford, Vermont in the United States to the south.

Toponymy
The place was first known as Sheppard's Mills in honor of Thomas Sheppard, one of the first inhabitants in 1879. However, the origin of the name Abercorn remains uncertain. This name is probably related to the title held by James Hamilton (1811-1885), Duke of Abercorn. This title is itself linked to a Scottish village located east of Edinburgh.

History
Thomas Spencer built the first log cabin near Abercorn in 1792. The village was originally called Sheppard's Mills in honour of Thomas Shepard, a New Hampshire loyalist who built the area's first grain and saw mill. Originally part of Sutton, Abercorn was established as a township in 1929.

Geography
The village is located on the northern edge of the Green Mountains in the Sutton Valley, flanked to the west by the Pinnacle and to the east by the Sutton Mountain range. The Sutton river runs through the valley, as does Route 139 and the Montreal, Maine and Atlantic Railway.

Located about 105 km from Montréal via Autoroute 10 and near the ski hills of Mount Sutton, Bromont, Jay Peak, Vermont, and Mont Owl's Head, Abercorn is a popular day trip and vacation spot for Montrealers.

Demographics 

Population trend:

Mother tongue (2016)

See also
List of village municipalities in Quebec

References

External links
Eastern Townships: Towns and Villages: Abercorn

Villages in Quebec
Incorporated places in Brome-Missisquoi Regional County Municipality